Paul Manly is a Canadian politician who served as the Member of Parliament (MP) for Nanaimo—Ladysmith from 2019 until 2021. A member of the Green Party of Canada, he was elected to the House of Commons in a by-election on May 6, 2019, making him the second elected Green federal MP in Canadian history, following party leader Elizabeth May's first election victory in the 2011 federal election.

Early and personal life 

Manly was born in Port Alice, British Columbia. His grandfather had a farm just outside of Nanaimo and Manly spent his formative years growing up in Ladysmith. He has been living in Nanaimo since 2002. His father, James Manly was a United Church minister and a New Democratic Party member of the House of Commons for the 32nd and 33rd Canadian Parliaments. His mother Eva Manly, a graduate of the University of Ottawa (BFA '85) is a multi-disciplinary artist who has collaborated with him on several video and documentary projects.

Manly graduated from Algonquin College in Ottawa with a diploma in broadcasting and went on to earn a degree in media studies and global studies from Vancouver Island University. Manly is married to Samantha Letourneau, and has two daughters and one granddaughter.

Career 
Manly started making documentary films 1991.
His first major film was a collaboration with his parents on a historic documentary about residential schools, entitled the Awakening of Elizabeth Shaw. This video documents one white woman’s response to the unfair and inhumane treatment of First Nations children in British Columbia’s residential schools.
He collaborated with his parents again on a film about human rights workers in Guatemala entitled ‘Bringing Truth to Light’.

His film Sombrio documents the end of a community of surfers and squatters on the south west coast of Vancouver Island. In 2007, Manly videotaped one police provocateur inciting violence at the Security and Prosperity Partnership (SPP) leaders event. He included that footage in his film ‘You, Me and the SPP’, which he released in 2009. Manly has made two films about water issues on Vancouver Island, ‘Voices of the River’ about the Nanaimo River, and ‘Troubled Water’ about the community drinking-water watershed on the east coast of the island.

In 2010, Manly produced a video about the export of raw bitumen out of the Port of Vancouver and the Trans Mountain pipeline expansion. He then produced a PSA with Pamela Anderson about the issue.

He was an equipment manager at the Satellite Video Exchange Society for six years.

He was a director on the board of the development company for the Pacific Gardens Cohousing Community, a multi-million dollar housing project. He served 11 years as a board director of Mid Island Consumer Services Cooperative. Previously, Manly was also a director on the national board of the Council of Canadians representing the B.C. Yukon region.

Politics
Manly initially sought the NDP nomination for Nanaimo—Ladysmith in the 2015 election. He was denied by the party's federal executive for publicly criticizing the NDP because the party did not advocate on behalf of his father Jim when the former MP was detained for four days by the Israeli military in 2012. He ran for the Green Party in that election, finishing in fourth place.

Manly was elected to the House of Commons in a by-election on May 6, 2019, making him the second elected Green MP in Canadian history, following party leader Elizabeth May's first election victory in the 2011 federal election.

He was re-elected in the 2019 federal election. Manly has been a critic of the extradition case against Meng Wanzhou.

During the 43rd Parliament Manly introduced two private member bills (though neither came to a vote): Bill C-261 to prohibit marine vessels from loading thermal coal that is to be transported outside Canada, and Bill C-252 that would require public consultation during the course of international trade negotiations.

Manly was defeated in the 2021 federal election.

In 2022, he was elected to Nanaimo City Council in the 2022 British Columbia municipal elections.

Parliamentary Work 
In February 2020, Manly submitted an amendment to Bill C-4, the Canada-United States-Mexico Agreement Implementation Act, to the Standing Committee on International Trade.

In February 2021, Manly submitted five amendments to Bill C-18, the Canada-United Kingdom Trade Continuity Agreement Implementation Act, to the Standing Committee on International Trade.

In April 2021, 4 of Manly’s 29 submitted amendments were adopted by the members of the  Standing Committee on Canadian Heritage on Bill C-10, An Act to amend the Broadcasting Act.

Electoral record

References

External links

1964 births
Green Party of Canada MPs
Living people
Members of the House of Commons of Canada from British Columbia
People from the Regional District of Mount Waddington
Nanaimo city councillors